The 1996 Three Days of De Panne was the 20th edition of the Three Days of De Panne cycle race and was held on 2 April to 4 April 1996. The race started in Harelbeke and finished in De Panne. The race was won by Viatcheslav Ekimov.

General classification

References

Three Days of Bruges–De Panne
1996 in Belgian sport